Mahlon Dickerson (1770–1853) was a U.S. Senator from New Jersey. Senator Dickerson may also refer to:

Steven Dickerson (fl. 2010s), Tennessee State Senate
Tommy Dickerson (born 1945), Mississippi State Senate